Franconia Brewing Company is a brewery in McKinney, Texas, USA.  The owner, Arvind Sharma, is an experienced businessman in the service industry.

As of October 2022, Franconia beers are available statewide through self distribution.

References

External links
 Official company website

Beer brewing companies based in Texas
Companies based in McKinney, Texas